Biskupiec  is a village in Nowe Miasto County, Warmian-Masurian Voivodeship, in northern Poland. It is the seat of the gmina (administrative district) called Gmina Biskupiec. 

The village has a population of 1,927.

References

Biskupiec